Michael Alex Burghart is a British politician, academic and former teacher who has served as Member of Parliament (MP) for Brentwood and Ongar since 2017. A member of the Conservative Party, he was formerly a special adviser to Theresa May. He has been serving as Parliamentary Secretary for the Cabinet Office since October 2022.

Early life
Burghart was born in Dorset, the son of two state-school teachers.  He attended Millfield School in Somerset, having gained a scholarship to the school.  Burghart read History at Christ Church, Oxford. He completed his PhD at King's College London in 2007 entitled "The Mercian polity, 716–918".

Career

Academic
After university, Burghart taught history at Warwick School before becoming a history tutor at King's College, London.  In 2005 he was the lead researcher for the King's College, London project on interrogating Anglo-Saxon charters using digital technologies.

Policy Adviser
Burghart became a political and policy adviser to Tim Loughton MP, then Shadow Minister for Children and Young People in 2008. He moved on to the Department for Education, where he worked on the Munro Review of Child Protection

In 2012 Burghart became Director of Policy at the Centre for Social Justice. In February 2016 Burghart was appointed Director of Strategy and Advocacy for the Children's Commissioner for England, Anne Longfield. Later that year he became part of Prime Minister Theresa May's policy team.

Parliamentary
Burghart stood against Jeremy Corbyn in Islington North in 2015. He told the Islington Gazette that, if elected, the first thing he would do would be to "[d]ance a jig (and try to resuscitate Jeremy Corbyn)." Although he was not elected, Burghart increased the Conservative share of the vote from 14.2% to 17.2%. Corbyn became leader of the Labour Party a few months later.

He was selected for the Brentwood and Ongar seat under by-election rules on 28 April 2017 following the decision by Sir Eric Pickles to stand down at the 2017 general election.
Burghart was re-elected on 12 December 2019 with an increased majority of 29,065.

Burghart has been a member of the Joint Committee on Human Rights and the Work and Pensions Select Committee. He chairs the APPG on Adverse Childhood Experiences and was made PPS to the prime minister Boris Johnson in July 2019. He was previously Parliamentary Private Secretary to the Attorney General, Geoffrey Cox, and to the Northern Ireland Secretary of State, Karen Bradley.

In July 2019, at the formation of the first Johnson ministry, Burghart was appointed Parliamentary Private Secretary to the Prime Minister Boris Johnson.

On 17 September 2021, Burghart was appointed Parliamentary Under-Secretary of State for Apprenticeships and Skills at the Department for Education during the second cabinet reshuffle of the second Johnson ministry.

On 6 July 2022, Burghart resigned from government, citing Boris Johnson's handling of the Chris Pincher scandal in a joint statement with fellow Ministers Kemi Badenoch, Neil O'Brien, Lee Rowley and Julia Lopez.

On 21 September 2022, Burghart was appointed Parliamentary Under-Secretary of State for Pensions and Growth at the Department for Work and Pensions.  

On 25th February 2023, Burghart was re-adopted by the Parliamentary Selection Council of the Brentwood and Ongar Conservative Association to represent the Conservative Party, for the Brentwood and Ongar seat at the next General Election.

Writing
Burghart is the author of 'A Better Start in Life: Long-term approaches for the most vulnerable children', published by Policy Exchange in 2013. Burghart has written extensively about early medieval England, writing for The Times Literary Supplement for over 12 years, The Spectator and BBC History.

Personal life
Burghart has sat on the Board of the Yarlington Housing Group and was Vice Chair of Governors at Queensmill School for children with autism.

References

External links

Living people
People educated at Millfield
Alumni of Christ Church, Oxford
Alumni of King's College London
UK MPs 2017–2019
UK MPs 2019–present
Conservative Party (UK) MPs for English constituencies
Parliamentary Private Secretaries to the Prime Minister
Year of birth missing (living people)